Gaber Abdelaty Abouzeid (20 June 1954 – 15 August 2020) was an Egyptian volleyball player. He competed in the 1976 and 1984 Summer Olympics.

References

1954 births
2020 deaths
Volleyball players at the 1976 Summer Olympics
Volleyball players at the 1984 Summer Olympics
Egyptian men's volleyball players
Olympic volleyball players of Egypt